Soweto is the debut album led by American jazz drummer Billy Higgins recorded in 1979 and released on the Italian Red label.

Reception
The AllMusic review by Ron Wynn states "this was a welcome entry by a good group that unfortunately didn't work together longer."

Track listing
All compositions by Billy Higgins except as indicated
 "Soweto – 9:20  
 "Clockwise" (Cedar Walton) – 8:08   
 "Neptune" (Bob Berg) – 5:36   
 "Back to Bologna" (Walton) – 8:05
 "Bahia, Bahia, Bahia" – 10:20

Personnel
Billy Higgins – drums, guitar, vocals
Bob Berg – tenor saxophone
Cedar Walton – piano
Tony Dumas – bass

References 

Red Records albums
Billy Higgins albums
1979 albums